The Guinea women's national football team represents Guinea in international women's football. It is governed by the Guinean Football Federation.

History

The Guinea women's national team played their first international match against Nigeria on 4 May 1991 in a Women's Football World Cup qualifying match. The match ended in a 3–0 defeat.

Results and fixtures

The following is a list of match results in the last 12 months, as well as any future matches that have been scheduled.

Legend

2012

2023

Coaching staff

Current coaching staff
update : 19/1/2023

Manager history

 Sékou Tidiane Kaba(?–present)

Players

Current squad
 This is the  convened selection for the 2023 WAFU Zone A Women's Cup named on January 2022 . 

 Caps and goals accurate up to and including 30 October 2021.

Recent call-ups
The following players have been called up to a Guinea squad in the past 12 months.

Previous squads

WAFU Zone A Women's Cup
2023 WAFU Zone A Women's Cup squads

Records
 Active players in bold, statistics correct as of 2020.

Most capped players

Top goalscorers

Competitive record

FIFA Women's World Cup

Olympic Games

Africa Women Cup of Nations

African Games

WAFU Women's Cup record

See also
 Sports in Guinea
 Football in Guinea
 Women's football in Guinea
 Guinean Football Federation
 Guinea women's national under-20 football team
 Guinea women's national under-17 football team

References

External links
 Guinea profile at FIFA.com

African women's national association football teams
women